Alexander Tikhonov (born 4 May 1988, Miass) is a Russian swimmer who competes in the Men's 200 and 400 m individual medley. At the 2012 Summer Olympics he finished 21st overall in the heats in the Men's 400 metre individual medley and failed to reach the final.  In the 200 m individual medley he finished in 24th place in the heats and again failed to progress.

References

Russian male swimmers
Living people
Olympic swimmers of Russia
Swimmers at the 2008 Summer Olympics
Swimmers at the 2012 Summer Olympics
Russian male freestyle swimmers
Universiade medalists in swimming
1988 births
People from Miass
Universiade bronze medalists for Russia
Medalists at the 2015 Summer Universiade
Male medley swimmers
Sportspeople from Chelyabinsk Oblast